Ashbridge is an English surname. Notable people with this name include:

 Elizabeth Ashbridge, English-born Quaker minister in New England 
 George Richard Ashbridge, New Zealand accountant and teacher
 Ken Ashbridge, English footballer
 Noel Ashbridge, English engineer
 Samuel Howell Ashbridge, American politician
 Thomas Ashbridge, English association footballer

Other
 Ashbridge's Creek
 Ashbridge's Bay
 Ashbridge Estate
 David Ashbridge Log House

See also 
 Asbridge

English-language surnames